The Trademark Reporter is a bimonthly peer-reviewed academic journal covering trademark law and related topics. It was first established in 1911 and is published by the International Trademark Association. Articles published by the journal have been cited by different courts.

See also 
 List of intellectual property law journals

References

External links
 
 

Business law journals
Bimonthly journals
Academic journals published by learned and professional societies
English-language journals
Publications established in 1911